Theofanis-Marios "Fanis" Mavrommatis (Greek: Θεοφάνης-Μάριος "Φάνης" Μαυρομμάτης, born 16 January 1997) is a Greek professional footballer who plays as a centre-back for Super League club Atromitos.

Career

Panathinaikos
Mavrommatis  joined Panathinaikos from the youth ranks of Panargiakos.

On 1 September 2018, Mavrommatis made his first professional appearance for the team in the 2018–19 Superleague Greece game against Lamia. In January 2020, Theofanis Mavrommatis was shifted out on loan to Danish club SonderjyskE after a disappointing first half of the season, but he showed promise with reliable performance in Denmark before the coronavirus pandemic halted the Superliga. Reports have suggested that Mavrommatis will be given another chance by Giorgos Donis, but the centre-back will only be used as a back-up option.

Atromitos
On 31 January 2021, following his release from Panathinaikos, Mavrommatis signed a contract with Atromitos, until the summer of 2022.

Career statistics

References

External links

1997 births
Living people
Greek footballers
Greek expatriate footballers
Greece under-21 international footballers
Greece youth international footballers
Panathinaikos F.C. players
SønderjyskE Fodbold players
Atromitos F.C. players
Super League Greece players
Danish Superliga players
Greek expatriate sportspeople in Denmark
Expatriate men's footballers in Denmark
Association football defenders
Footballers from Argos, Peloponnese